Neaves is a surname. Notable people with the surname include:

Alan Neaves (1925–2022), Australian public servant, lawyer and judge
Charles Neaves, Lord Neaves (1800–1876), Scottish advocate, judge, theologian and writer
Kevon Neaves (born 1985), Trinidad and Tobago footballer
Rebecca Neaves (born 1997), Australian rules footballer

See also
Neave (disambiguation)
Neves (surname)